Tsutsujigaoka Station the name of two train stations in Japan.

Tsutsujigaoka Station (Miyagi) (榴ヶ岡駅), in Sendai, Miyagi Prefecture
Tsutsujigaoka Station (Tokyo) (つつじヶ丘駅), in Tokyo